The Shire of Colac Otway is a local government area in the Barwon South West region of Victoria, Australia, located in the south-western part of the state. It includes the towns of Apollo Bay, Beeac, Beech Forest, Birregurra, Colac, Cressy, Forrest, Johanna, Kennett River, Lavers Hill, Warrion and Wye River. It came into existence on 23 September 1994 through the amalgamation of the local government areas of City of Colac, Shire of Colac, part of the Shire of Otway and part of the Shire of Heytesbury.

The Shire is governed and administered by the Colac Otway Shire Council; its seat of local government and administrative centre is located at the council headquarters in Colac, it also has a service centre located in Apollo Bay. The Shire is named after the combination of the names for the former City of Colac, and Shires of Colac and Otway, from which the majority of the LGA was formed. The name Colac is used for both the main urban settlement and the lake, Lake Colac, which are located in the north-centre of the LGA. Colac is also the most populous urban centre in the LGA with a population of almost 12,000. The name Otways is used for the major geographical features located in the south of the LGA, which are The Otways and Cape Otway. Cape Otway was originally named by Lieutenant James Grant who was the commander of the vessel, the Lady Nelson. He named it after Captain William Otway who was one of the commissioners of the Transport Board, on 7 December 1800.

History
The Colac district is the traditional land for the Gulidjan people and was known as “Kolak” or “Kolakgnat” which means ‘belonging to sand’. The Gulidjan people are of the Easter Maar Nation.

The earliest European settlers arrived in the district in the 1830s and settled around Lake Colac.

Council

Current composition
The council is composed of seven councillors elected to represent an unsubdivided municipality. In order of election in 2020, they are:

Former Wards (1996–2008)
Colac – had three councillors
Murray – had one councillor
Otway – had one councillor
Warrion – had one councillor

Administration and governance
The council meets in the council chambers at the council headquarters in the Colac Municipal Offices, which is also the location of the council's administrative activities. It also provides customer services at both its administrative centre in Colac, and its service centre in Apollo Bay.

Townships and localities
The 2021 census, the shire had a population of 22,423 up from 20,972 in the 2016 census

^ - Territory divided with another LGA

See also
List of places on the Victorian Heritage Register in the Shire of Colac Otway

References

External links

Colac Otway Shire Council official website
Colac Otway Web – Regional Web Site
Metlink local public transport map
Link to Land Victoria interactive maps
Colac Otway Shire: Know Your Council

Local government areas of Victoria (Australia)
Barwon South West (region)
 
Otway Ranges